Avril Lorraine Bowring (née Usher) (born 1942), is a female former athlete who competed for England.

Athletics career
She represented England in the 400 metres, at the 1970 British Commonwealth Games in Edinburgh, Scotland.

She ran for the Kent Athletic Club.

References

1942 births
English female sprinters
Athletes (track and field) at the 1970 British Commonwealth Games
Living people
Commonwealth Games competitors for England